State Route 8 (SR 8) is a  north–south state highway in East and Middle Tennessee. It connects the cities of Chattanooga  and McMinnville via Signal Mountain and Dunlap.

Route description

Hamilton County

SR 8 begins in Hamilton County as the unsigned companion route to US 41/US 76 at the Georgia border in East Ridge, where they continue concurrent with Georgia State Route 3. As Ringgold Road, they head east and have an interchange with I-75 and go through downtown before passing through the Bachman Tubes and entering Chattanooga, where it becomes Westside Drive and having an interchange with I-24. They then come to an intersection and become concurrent with US 11/US 64/SR 2 (E 23rd Street) and head north on Dodds Avenue. They pass through neighborhoods before US 41/US 76/SR 8 split from US 11/US 64/SR 2 (Dodds Avenue) and continue east along E Main Street. They then become concurrent with SR 17 (S Willow Street) before SR 8 splits off and heads north along Market Street. SR 8 enters downtown as a signed secondary highway, having intersections with SR 316 (M L King Boulevard) and SR 389 (W 4th Avenue) before crossing the Tennessee River (via the Market Street Bridge) and becoming Cherokee Boulevard. SR 8 then has an interchange with US 27/SR 29/SR 27, at the southern terminus of US 127, which it becomes concurrent with, along with SR 27, in Red Bank, with SR 8 becoming unsigned again. They then come to a junction where SR 27 splits off and goes west (signed south) before winding its way up a mountain and going through Signal Mountain. US 127/SR 8, then go through Walden and Fairmount before crossing into Sequatchie County.

Sequatchie County

They then go through Lone Oak before meandering down a mountainside and entering a valley in Center Point, where they intersect SR 283. US 127/SR 8 then enter Dunlap and have an intersection with SR 28, which becomes the unsigned companion route of US 127. They go north through downtown before coming to an interchange with SR 111, where SR 8 separates from US 127/SR 28 and follows that route, becoming signed for the first time as a primary highway. SR 111/SR 8 leave Dunlap and wind their way through a narrow valley to Cagle and have an intersection with SR 399. SR 8 soon leaves SR 111 and heads eastward to enter Van Buren County.

Van Buren and Warren Counties

SR 8 shortly runs through a remote area of Van Buren County Before crossing into Warren County. It then runs through some farmland and crosses the Collins River before junctioning with SR 127 and entering McMinnville. SR 8 then comes to an end at an intersection with SR 56 just west of downtown.

Major junctions

See also 
List of state routes in Tennessee

References 

https://www.tn.gov/content/dam/tn/tdot/maps/2021-traffic-maps-with-aadt/HamiltonCounty2021Combined.pdf
008
Transportation in Hamilton County, Tennessee
Transportation in Chattanooga, Tennessee
Transportation in Sequatchie County, Tennessee
Transportation in Van Buren County, Tennessee
Transportation in Warren County, Tennessee